The Award for Peoples Choice: Favorite Canadian Group is an award presented at the MuchMusic Video Awards. It must be given to a Canadian duo or group.

Winners

MuchMusic Video Awards